Daniel Richard Crissinger (December 10, 1860 – July 12, 1942) was an American banker and lawyer who served as the 3rd chairman of the Federal Reserve from 1923 to 1927. Crissinger previously served as the 14th comptroller of the Currency from 1921 to 1923.

Early life
Crissinger was born on December 10, 1860 to John M. Crissinger a leading lumberjack tradesman and Margaret (Ganzhorn) Crissinger a German immigrant in Tully Township, Marion County, Ohio. He was named after his grand-uncle Daniel Crissinger and was an only child after his brother died at infancy. Crissinger was educated in Caledonia, Ohio, and graduated from Caledonia High School in 1880. He spent one year as a grade school teacher and he worked for one year in the high school.

He attended Buchtel College in Akron, Ohio and graduated 1885. He studied law with Judge William Z. Davis in Marion, Ohio until he began formal study at the University of Cincinnati.  After graduation in June 1886, he became a partner of Judge Davis.

Career 

In 1893 Crissinger was elected city solicitor of Marion, Ohio.  He served in several partnerships and was nominated for Congress in 1904 and 1906 as a Democrat.  Crissinger was vice-president of City National Bank of Marion, Ohio at the time of its founding and he became president of the bank in 1911.   He held other posts including director of Marion Steam Shovel Company, president of National City Bank & Trust Company, director and vice-president of the Marion Union Stock Yards Company director, a director and treasurer of the Marion Packing Company, a director of the Marion County Telephone Company, and president of the Marion Cemetery Association.

Crissinger was nominated in 1921 by Republican President Warren G. Harding, who was a friend and neighbor in Ohio, to serve as the 14th Comptroller of the Currency. He became the 3rd Chairman of the Federal Reserve in 1923 and he served under presidents Harding and Coolidge.

Death 
He died on July 12, 1942.

References

Further reading
Denslow, William R., and Harry S. Truman. 10,000 famous Freemasons. Trenton, Missouri: Missouri Lodge of Research, 1957
Kane, Thomas P. The Romance and Tragedy of Banking. New York: The Bankers Publishing Co, 1923.

External links
 Statements and Speeches of Daniel R. Crissinger

  
 

1860 births
1942 deaths
Chairs of the Federal Reserve
Coolidge administration personnel
Harding administration personnel
People from Marion County, Ohio
United States Comptrollers of the Currency